The following is a list of notable people associated with California State University, Long Beach. CSULB has more than 320,000 alumni as of 2018.

Alumni

Entertainment

 Millicent Borges Accardi: poet and writer, NEA winner
 Paul "Coy" Allen: television director, Sam & Cat; television producer, R&B Divas: Atlanta, R&B Divas: Los Angeles; music video director
 Richard Bach: fiction and nonfiction author, Jonathan Livingston Seagull
 Tony Baxter: Disney Imagineering executive
 Guy Bee: director of ER
 Daniele Bolelli: author
 Jan Burke: mystery author, 2000 Edgar Award for Best Novel
 Bobby Burgess: Actor and Dancer on the TV-shows Mickey Mouse Club (the original series), The Lawrence Welk Show, and The Donna Reed Show.
 Chris Carter: creator and producer of the X-Files
  Sarah M. Daugherty: poet and writer, Co-Editor:  Chiron Review Literary magazine  
 Agnes de Mille: award-winning choreographer, niece of Cecil B. DeMille
 John Dykstra: winner of two Academy Awards for special effects
 Jonathan Fahn: voice/TV/film actor, as well as an award-winning film and stage director, producer, and writer.
 Matt Gourley: actor and comedian; co-creator of Superego
 Donna Hilbert: poet and writer
 Mark Steven Johnson: director of Hollywood thriller Daredevil; writer of Grumpy Old Men and sequel Grumpier Old Men
 Joe Johnston: director of Jurassic Park III and Jumanji
 Bob Kevoian: radio host
 J. F. Lawton: author of Pretty Woman
 Raymond Lee: actor
 Steve Martin: actor and comedian
 Tim Minear: television writer and producer, X-Files, Angel, Firefly, Wonderfalls
 John Roland: longtime reporter and anchor for WNYW in New York City from 1969 to 2004
 Stu Rosen: winner of 10 Emmy awards
 Steve Ryan: author, game creator, syndicated puzzle columnist, TV game show historian and creator, Blockbusters
 Penelope Spheeris: film director, producer and screenwriter best known for Wayne's World (film) and The Decline of Western Civilization trilogy
 Steven Spielberg: filmmaker, student from 1965 to 1969 and 2001–2002
 David Twohy: author of Terminal Velocity and The Fugitive
 Cristina Valenzuela: animation and video game voice actress
 Maitland Ward: actress, Boy Meets World
 Bill Wasserzieher (B.A. and M.A.): music and film critic, fiction writer
 Jessica Williams: comedian and correspondent on The Daily Show
 Stan Winston: special effects designer
 Bob Woods: actor, One Life to Live
 Linda Woolverton: screenwriter Beauty and the Beast and The Lion King
 Jennifer Yuh Nelson: animation film director and storyboard artist

Music

Arleen Auger: opera singer
 Dave Alvin: singer-songwriter: founder of The Blasters, former member of X
 John Bettis: songwriter who has 26 gold and 10 platinum records
Larry Carlton: jazz fusion guitarist
 Richard and Karen Carpenter: The Carpenters, pop duo
 Melissa Hasin: cellist
 Bobby Hatfield: half of The Righteous Brothers and Rock 'n Roll Hall of Fame inductee
 Greg Kriesel: bass player for The Offspring
 Bill Medley: half of The Righteous Brothers
 Bradley Nowell: lead singer and guitarist of rock band Sublime
 Jae Park: member of the South Korean boy band Day6
 Joon Park: member of the South Korean boy band g.o.d
 John Patitucci: Grammy Award-winning jazz bassist
 Basil Poledouris: film composer
 Jenni Rivera: singer-songwriter
 Mark Turner: jazz saxophonist

Government and politics

Robert Garcia: mayor of Long Beach, CA

 Kathy Augustine (M.P.A.): Nevada State Controller (1999–2006)
 Patricia Bates (B.S.): serving in the California State Senate
 Bill Brand (B.S.): Mayor of Redondo Beach
 Ian Calderon (B.A. 2008): California State Assemblyman
 Debbie Cook (B.S.): Mayor of Huntington Beach
 Kevin Drum (B.A. 1981): political blogger and columnist
 Margaret Finlay (M.P.A. 2000): former mayor of Duarte, California
 George Gascón (B.A. 1977): Los Angeles County District Attorney, former District Attorney of San Francisco, former police chief 
 Lena Gonzalez (B.A.): serving in the California State Senate
 Eklil Ahmad Hakimi (M.S. 1998): former Deputy Minister of Foreign Affairs of Afghanistan
 Tim Leslie (M.P.A.): California State Senator
 John Moorlach (B.A. 1977): California State Senator
 Patrick O'Donnell (B.A., M.P.A.): currently serving in the California State Assembly
 Jenny Oropeza (B.S.): California State Senator
 Curt Pringle (B.A., M.P.A.): Speaker of the California State Assembly and Mayor of Anaheim
 Dana Rohrabacher (B.A. 1969): United States Congressman
 Gloria Romero (B.A., M.A.): California State Senate Majority leader
 Wade Sanders: Deputy Assistant United States Secretary of the Navy for Reserve Affairs and convicted sex offender
 John G. Schmitz (M.A. 1960): United States Congressman and 1972 American Independent Party candidate for President of the United States
 Kelly Seyarto (M.P.A.): member of the California State Assembly
 Edward Ulloa (B.A.): attorney and former criminal prosecutor

Sports
 Guy Baker: head coach of the USA Women's Water Polo team; led the team to three consecutive Olympic medal ceremonies (2000-silver) (2004-bronze) (2008-silver)
 Gil Castillo: amateur wrestler; retired MMA fighter
 Amber Corwin: figure skater and costume designer
 Paul Goydos: PGA golfer
 John Mallinger: PGA golfer
 Pat McCormick: four-time Olympic gold medalist, won both the platform and springboard events, in both (1952 and 1956)
 Mark O'Meara: champion golfer
 Tim Shaw: Olympic silver medalist 1976 and 1984 (Water Polo), Sullivan Award Winner
 Dwight Stones: two-time Olympic high jump bronze medalist, (1972 and 1976); sports commentator

Baseball
 Abe Alvarez: pitcher, Palfinger Reggio Emilia (Italy)
 John Bowker: first baseman, San Francisco Giants
 Brent Cookson: retired outfielder, Kansas City Royals and Los Angeles Dodgers
 Mark Cresse:  Bullpen coach for the Los Angeles Dodgers.
 Bobby Crosby: shortstop, Pittsburgh Pirates
 Matt Duffy: infielder, Tampa Bay Rays
 Jarren Duran: outfielder, Boston Red Sox
 Danny Espinosa: second baseman, Washington Nationals
 Marco Estrada: pitcher, Toronto Blue Jays
 Mike Gallo:  pitcher, MLB free agent
 Jason Giambi: retired first baseman, Colorado Rockies
 Chris Gomez: shortstop, MLB free agent
 Evan Longoria: third baseman, Tampa Bay Rays
 Paul McAnulty: outfielder, Los Angeles Angels of Anaheim
 Cesar Ramos: pitcher, Los Angeles Angels of Anaheim
 Jeremy Reed: outfielder, Toronto Blue Jays
 Termel Sledge: outfielder, played for Montreal Expos, Washington Nationals and San Diego Padres
 Steve Trachsel: pitcher, MLB free agent
 Troy Tulowitzki: shortstop, Toronto Blue Jays
 Jason Vargas: pitcher, Philadelphia Phillies
 Nick Vincent (born 1986): pitcher in the Philadelphia Phillies organization
 Jered Weaver: pitcher, Los Angeles Angels of Anaheim
 Vance Worley: pitcher, Baltimore Orioles

Basketball
 Andrew Betts: Charlotte Hornets 1998 draftee
Deishuan Booker (born 1996): basketball player in the Israeli Basketball Premier League
 Cindy Brown: Olympic gold medalist (1988), ABL (Seattle Reign), and WNBA (Detroit Shock)
 James Ennis: Miami Heat
 George Gervin: leading scorer four times in a row with the San Antonio Spurs
 Lucious Harris: Dallas Mavericks, Philadelphia 76ers, New Jersey Nets, Cleveland Cavaliers
 Juaquin Hawkins: Houston Rockets
 Craig Hodges: Los Angeles Clippers, Los Angeles Lakers, Milwaukee Bucks, Phoenix Suns, Chicago Bulls 1991 and 92 NBA champion
Gabe Levin (born 1994): American-Israeli basketball player in the Israeli Basketball Premier League
 Mike Montgomery: Head Coach, University of California, Berkeley
 Ed Ratleff: Houston Rockets, Olympic silver medalist (1972)
 Bryon Russell: Washington Wizards, Utah Jazz, Los Angeles Lakers, Denver Nuggets
 Jerry Tarkanian: coached Long Beach State from 1968 to 1973, later at UNLV and Fresno State
 Chuck Terry: Milwaukee Bucks, San Antonio Spurs, New York Nets
 Penny Toler: first player to score a basket in the WNBA, head coach and general manager of the Los Angeles Sparks
 Michael Wiley: San Antonio Spurs
 Morlon Wiley: assistant coach, Orlando Magic; younger brother of Michael Wiley

American football
 George Allen: Head coach, coach of the Washington Redskins, coached the Los Angeles Rams
 Russ Bolinger: NFL offensive lineman
 Willie Brown: NFL, NFL Hall of Fame Oakland Raiders' defensive back
 Dan Bunz: NFL, San Francisco 49ers' linebacker
 Terrell Davis: NFL, Denver Broncos' football running back
 Jim Fassel:  former offensive coordinator of the NFL's Baltimore Ravens and former head coach of the New York Giants
 Steve Folsom: NFL tight end
 Jeff Graham: NFL quarterback
 Mike Horan: NFL, Denver Broncos' punter
 David Howard: NFL linebacker
 Lynn Hoyem: NFL offensive lineman
 Ron Johnson: American football player
 Charles Lockett, NFL wide receiver
 Mike McCoy: Coach, San Diego Chargers
 Terry Metcalf: NFL, Arizona Cardinals' running back
 Dean Miraldi: NFL, offensive lineman
 Billy Parks: NFL, wide receiver
 Ben Rudolph: NFL, defensive lineman
 Mark Seay: NFL, San Diego Chargers' wide receiver
 Jeff Severson: NFL, safety

Rowing
 Joan Lind Van Blom: Olympic rower, Silver Medal Single Sculls 1976 Montreal, Silver Medal Coxed Quad Sculls 1984 Los Angeles, first woman to receive Olympic medal in the sport for the United States

Volleyball

 Tara Cross-Battle: Olympic volleyball player
 Bob Ctvrtlik: Olympic gold medalist (1988),  volleyball, IOC member
 Tayyiba Haneef-Park: Olympic silver medalist (2008), volleyball
 Brent Hilliard: Head Coach, University of San Diego, Olympic bronze medal (1992), Volleyball National Championship and NCAA Player of the Year (1992)
 Tom Hoff: Olympic gold medalist (2008), volleyball
 David Lee: Olympic gold medalist (2008), volleyball
 Misty May-Treanor: Olympic gold medalist (2004,2008 and 2012), women's beach volleyball
 Danielle Scott-Arruda: Olympic silver medalist (2008), volleyball
 Scott Touzinsky: Olympic gold medalist (2008), volleyball

Visual arts
 Chris Bachalo: illustrator, DC and Marvel Comics (X-Men)
 John Cederquist, sculptor, BA in 1969, MA in 1971
 Cathy Cooper: stylist, artist, model
 Helen Feyler-Switz: sculptor, painter, art instructor
 Roberta Gregory: comic book writer
 Seonna Hong: painter, B.A. in art
 Gilbert "Magú" Luján: artist
 Betye Saar: assemblage artist
 Shag (Josh Agle): painter and designer
 Greg Simkins, B.A. in Studio Art
 Linda Vallejo an American artist known for painting, sculpture and ceramics.

Journalism
 Scott Stantis: editorial cartoonist for The Chicago Tribune, creator of the comic strips The Buckets and Prickly City

Academics
 Erin Gruwell: inspiring teacher from Freedom Writers, the book and movie
 Lee Mallory: poet, author and retired English professor at Santa Ana College
 Dennis J. Murray: President of Marist College
 John Sailhamer: academic and theologian

Other
 J. Jon Bruno: the Episcopal Bishop of Los Angeles
 Linda Burhansstipanov, MSPH, DrPH, Cherokee Nation of Oklahoma member, public health educator and researcher focused on Native American cancer care and support
 Neil Campbell: biologist/author
 Ronald Chagoury: co-founder and CEO of the Chagoury Group
 Libby Gill: leadership speaker, executive coach and author
 Ken Hoang: professional Super Smash Bros. player, with the nickname "King of Smash"
 Palmer Lucky: Creator of the Oculus Rift/Ranked #26 on Forbes' 2015 list of America's richest entrepreneurs under 40
 Alex Meruelo: Billionaire owner of the Meruelo Group, the Arizona Coyotes of the NHL, Fuji Food, multiple radio stations, casinos and Colom Island
 John Platt: Microsoft researcher, astronomer
 J. Warner Wallace: homicide detective and Christian apologist
 Laura Yeager: U.S. Army general

Fictional alumnus
The character Alan Harper (Jon Cryer) of the sitcom Two and a Half Men graduated from CSULB. This was stated in the episode, "The Salmon Under My Sweater".

Faculty
 Phil Alvin: taught mathematics at CSULB; member of The Blasters band
 Xiaolan Bao: professor of history
 Vera Barstow: violinist and teacher
 Verne Carlson: taught cinematography, author and cinematographer
 August Coppola: Professor of Comparative Literature
Karla Diaz: school of art
 Fitzhugh Dodson: taught in the Psychology department from 1962
 Robert Eisenman: Professor of Middle East Religions and Archaeology and Director of the Institute for the Study of Judeo-Christian Origins at California State University, Long Beach; Visiting Senior Member of Linacre College, Oxford University; expert on the Dead Sea Scrolls
 Karen L. Gould (born 1948): President of Brooklyn College
 Jack Green: professor of the Geological Sciences; a volcanologist and lunar planetary scientist
 Steve Horn: Professor Emeritus, former President of the University; 5-term former U.S. Congressman
 Maulana Karenga: former Head of Black Studies Dept, author and activist best known as the founder of the African-American holiday of Kwanzaa
 Alan Lowenthal: professor of community psychology, State senator
 Kevin MacDonald: evolutionary psychologist professor, anti-semitic conspiracy theorist, white supremacist
 Ilan Mitchell-Smith: English professor, former child actor
 Clifton Snider, poet, novelist, literary critic specializing in Jungian and Queer Criticism
 Shira Tarrant: author and cultural critic; Women's, Gender, and Sexuality Studies Department

References

California State University, Long Beach people
Long Beach people